Albert Vincent Moschetti (January 1, 1920 – December 10, 2007) was an American professional basketball player. He played in the National Basketball League for the Sheboygan Red Skins during the 1944–45 season and averaged 5.0 points per game. He also played in the American Basketball League. While in college, Moschetti played for the St. John's team that won the 1943 National Invitation Tournament.

References

1920 births
2007 deaths
American Basketball League (1925–1955) players
American men's basketball players
Basketball coaches from New York (state)
Forwards (basketball)
High school basketball coaches in New York (state)
Sheboygan Red Skins players
Sportspeople from Brooklyn
Basketball players from New York City
St. John's Red Storm men's basketball players